The Marlboro Township School District is a community public school district that serves students in pre-kindergarten through eighth grade in Marlboro Township in Monmouth County, New Jersey, United States.

As of the 2018–19 school year, the district, comprising eight schools, had an enrollment of 4,784 students and 440.5 classroom teachers (on an FTE basis), for a student–teacher ratio of 10.9:1.

The district is classified by the New Jersey Department of Education as being in District Factor Group "I", the second-highest of eight groupings. District Factor Groups organize districts statewide to allow comparison by common socioeconomic characteristics of the local districts. From lowest socioeconomic status to highest, the categories are A, B, CD, DE, FG, GH, I and J.

Most public students in ninth through twelfth grades from Marlboro Township attend Marlboro High School, which is part of the Freehold Regional High School District, with some Marlboro students attending Colts Neck High School. The district also serves students from Colts Neck Township, Englishtown, Farmingdale, Freehold Borough, Freehold Township, Howell Township and Manalapan Township. Many Marlboro students attend the various Learning Centers and Academies available at other district high schools and students from other municipalities in the district attend Marlboro High School's Business Learning Center. As of the 2018–19 school year, Marlboro High School had an enrollment of 1,822 students and 127.2 classroom teachers (on an FTE basis), for a student–teacher ratio of 14.3:1 and Colts Neck High School had an enrollment of 1,358 students and 94.0 classroom teachers (on an FTE basis), for a student–teacher ratio of 14.4:1.

Schools 
The district has eight school facilities: one pre-school, five elementary schools and two middle schools. The schools (with 2018–19 enrollment data from the National Center for Education Statistics), are:

Preschool 
David C. Abbott Early Learning Center with 226 students (opened 2002) serves kindergarten and preschool special education. The latter group had in prior years been taught in the original "one room" Robertsville School built in 1832; this building still stands, down the road from the current Robertsville Elementary School.
Albert Perno, Principal

Elementary schools 
Defino Central Elementary School with 515 students in grades K-5 (opened 1957)
David Stratuik, Principal
Frank J. Dugan Elementary School with 616 students in grades K–5 (opened 1987)
Richard M. Pagliaro, Principal
Asher Holmes Elementary School with 504 students in grades 1–5 (opened 1973)
JoAnn Cilmi, Principal
Marlboro Elementary School with 489 students in grades K–5 (opened 1971)
Earl Tankard, Principal
Robertsville Elementary School with 486 students in grades 1–5 (opened 1968)
Jill Green, Principal

Middle schools 
Marlboro Memorial Middle School with 883 in grades 6-8 students, opened in 2003, and is home of the Monarch Lions, with the school colors of maroon and gold.
John Pacifico, Principal
Marlboro Middle School with 1,042 students in grades 6-8, opened in 1976 and is home of the Hawks.
Patricia Nieliwocki, Principal

Athletics
The Marlboro Mavericks is a wrestling team jointly shared by the two middle schools. Founded in 2004, they have a franchise record of 33–6, with three Divisional Championships, along with two consecutive tournament championships and in 2005–2006 had a perfect 12–0 record in dual meets.

Administration
Core members of the district's administration are:
Dr. Eric M. Hibbs, Superintendent
Vincent Caravello, Business Administrator / Board Secretary

Board of education
The district's board of education, with nine members, sets policy and oversees the fiscal and educational operation of the district through its administration. As a Type II school district, the board's trustees are elected directly by voters to serve three-year terms of office on a staggered basis, with three seats up for election each year held (since 2013) as part of the November general election.

References

External links 
 

School Data for the Marlboro Public Schools, National Center for Education Statistics
 
Colts Neck High School
Freehold Regional High School District

Marlboro Township, New Jersey
New Jersey District Factor Group I
School districts in Monmouth County, New Jersey